This is part of a list of Statutes of New Zealand for the period of the Fourth Labour Government of New Zealand up to and including part of the first year of the Fourth National Government of New Zealand.

1980s

1985  

 Adult Adoption Information Act  Amended: 1991
 Auckland Aotea Centre Empowering Act  Amended: 2001
 College House Act 
 Fish Royalties Act  Amended: 1986
 Goods and Services Tax Act 1985  Amended: 1986/87/88/89/90/91/92/93/94/95/96/2001/05
 Law Commission Act  Amended: 2002
 Longley Adoption Act 
 Mount Smart Regional Recreation Centre Act 
 National Bank of New Zealand Act 
 Nelson College Empowering Act 
 Parliamentary Service Act  Amended: 1988/91
 St Peter's School Trust Board Act  Amended: 1997
 Stockman-Howe Marriage Act 
Plus 183 Acts amended

1986  

 Commerce Act 1986
 Constitution Act  Amended: 1987/99/2005
 Development Finance Corporation of New Zealand Act  Amended: 1987/88
 Environment Act  Amended: 1989/96
 Fair Trading Act 1986 Amended: 1990/94/97/99/2000/01/03/06
 Homosexual Law Reform Act 
 Mount Albert Licensing Trust Dissolution Act 
 New Plymouth Boys' High School Empowering Act 
 New Zealand Market Development Board Act 
 Residential Tenancies Act  Amended: 1992/96
 State-Owned Enterprises Act  Amended: 1987/88/89/90/92/94/96/2004
 Survey Act  Amended: 1988/89/96
 Union Representatives Education Leave Act  Amended: 1991
Plus 111 Acts amended and 2 Acts repealed.

1987  

 Auckland Airport Act  Amended: 1988/96
 Auckland Domain Act 
 Conservation Act  Amended: 1988/90/93/94/96/98/99/2000/01/03/04/05
 Electricity Operators Act 
 Fencing of Swimming Pools Act  Amended: 1989/2007
 Labour Relations Act  Amended: 1988/89/90
 Local Government Official Information and Meetings Act  Amended: 1988/89/91/93/96/2003/04
 Maori Language Act  Amended: 1991
 New Zealand Horticulture Export Authority Act  Amended: 1990/92/2002/03
 New Zealand Nuclear Free Zone, Disarmament, and Arms Control Act 
 Parental Leave and Employment Protection Act  Amended: 1991/2004/05
 Plant Variety Rights Act  Amended: 1990/94/96/99
 Post Office Bank Act  Amended: 1988
 Postal Services Act  Amended: 1990/2001
 Shipping Act 
 Taupo Borough Council Empowering Act 
 Te Runanga o Ngati Porou Act 
 Telecommunications Act  Amended: 1988/90/94/97/2001/05/06
 Temporary Safeguard Authorities Act  Amended: 1994
 Translation into Maori of Maori Language Act 
 Victims of Offences Act  Amended: 1988/94/99
 Video Recordings Act  Amended: 1990
 Waikato Anglican Boys College Trust Act 
 Wellington Harbour Board and Wellington City Council Vesting and Empowering Act 
 Whakatane District Council Empowering Act 
 Wheat Producers Levy Act 
Plus 154 Acts amended and 5 Acts repealed.

1988  

 Access Training Scheme Act 
 AMP Perpetual Trustee Company Act 
 Clerk of the House of Representatives Act 
 Disputes Tribunals Act  Amended: 1995/98/99/2002
 Dumping and Countervailing Duties Act  Amended: 1990/94/2006
 Dunedin City Council Endowment Lands Act 
 External Relations Act 
 General Finance Limited Act 
 Hauraki Maori Trust Board Act 
 Imperial Laws Application Act 
 Import Control Act 
 Maniapoto Maori Trust Board Act 
 Ministry of Works and Development Abolition Act 
 New Zealand 1990 Commission Act 
 New Zealand Symphony Orchestra Act  Amended: 1994
 New Zealand Trade Development Board Act  Amended: 1994
 Petroleum Sector Reform Act 
 Police Complaints Authority Act  Amended: 1988/94
 Port Companies Act  Amended: 1990/93
 Protection of Personal and Property Rights Act  Amended: 1989/94/97/98/2007
 Rating Powers Act  Amended: 1989/91/92/96/99
 Road User Charges Orders Confirmation Act 
 State Sector Act  Amended: 1989/90/91/92/97/99/2003/04/07
 Taranaki Harbours Board Reclamation and Empowering Act 
 Te Runanga o Ngati Awa Act 
 Te Runanga o Ngati Whatua Act 
 Trustee Banks Restructuring Act  Amended: 1989
 Waikato Electricity Authority Act  Amended: 1990
 Whanganui River Trust Board Act 
 Wool Testing Authority Dissolution Act 
Plus 194 Acts amended and 4 Acts repealed.

1989  

 Abolition of the Death Penalty Act 
 Animals Law Reform Act 
 Children, Young Persons, and Their Families Act  Amended: 1989/94/96/98/2001/04/07
 Crimes of Torture Act  Amended: 2006
 Crown Forest Assets Act  Amended: 1992/93/95
 Ellen Harriet Eames Estate Act 
 Hawke's Bay Harbour Board Empowering Act 
 Licensing Fund Act 
 Maori Affairs Restructuring Act  Amended: 1991/96
 Maori Fisheries Act  Amended: 2001/06
 Motor Vehicle Securities Act  Amended: 1989/94
 PGG Trust Limited Act 
 Phosphate Commission of New Zealand Dissolution Act 
 Radiocommunications Act  Amended: 1990/94/95/96/2000/02/05/06/07
 Rural Banking and Finance Corporation of New Zealand Act 
 School Trustees Act 
 Tourist Hotel Corporation of New Zealand Act 
 Trade in Endangered Species Act  Amended: 1991/96/98/99/2005/07
 Transit New Zealand Act  Amended: 1990/91/92/95/97
 Transport Services Licensing Act  Amended: 1990/92/95/97
 Waterfront Industry Reform Act 
 Waterfront Industry Restructuring Act 
 Wheat Industry Research Levies Act 
Plus 117 Acts amended and 3 Acts repealed.

1990s

1990  
 AE Thorpe Limited Act 
 Casino Control Act 
 Commodity Levies Act  Amended: 1993/95
 Conservation Law Reform Act 
 Employment Equity Act 
 Foundation for Research, Science, and Technology Act  Amended: 1993/2001
 Health Research Council Act  Amended: 1991/2003
 Irrigation Schemes Act 
 Land Tax Abolition Act 
 Local Restoration Polls Act 
 Matamata-Piako District Council Empowering Act 
 Meteorological Services Act  Amended: 1992
 National Provident Fund Restructuring Act  Amended: 1991/92/97
 New Zealand Bill of Rights Act 
 New Zealand Railways Corporation Restructuring Act  Amended: 1993
 Ozone Layer Protection Act  Amended: 1993/94
 Runanga Iwi Act 
 Serious Fraud Office Act 
 Smoke-free Environments Act  Amended: 1990/91/93/95/97/2003
 Term Poll Act 
 Tower Corporation Act  Amended: 1989/95
 Transport Accident Investigation Commission Act  Amended: 1992/96/98/99
 Wellington Airport Act  Amended: 1996
Plus 101 Acts amended and 3 Acts repealed.

See also 
The above list may not be current and will contain errors and omissions. For more accurate information try:
 Walter Monro Wilson, The Practical Statutes of New Zealand, Auckland: Wayte and Batger 1867
 The Knowledge Basket: Legislation NZ
 New Zealand Legislation Includes some Imperial and Provincial Acts. Only includes Acts currently in force, and as amended.
 Legislation Direct List of statutes from 2003 to order

Lists of statutes of New Zealand